Katija Mira Pevec (born March 1, 1988) is an American actress. She is best known for her roles as Christina Beardsley in the 2005 film Yours, Mine and Ours, and Lauren Zelmer on the short-lived Nickelodeon television series, Just for Kicks.

Career 
Pevec was born in Honolulu, Hawaii. As a child, she took singing, dancing and acting lessons. She made her major acting debut in the lead role of the 2003 Air Bud sequel Air Bud: Spikes Back. In the next year she had a supporting role in the film Sleepover opposite Alexa Vega and Sara Paxton. Pevec's most notable role to date was in the 2005 Nickelodeon theatrical film Yours, Mine and Ours. As well as appearing in the films Art School Confidential (2006), Eagle Eye (2008), and Life Is Hot in Cracktown (2009).

In 2006, she co-starred in the Nickelodeon comedy-drama series, Just for Kicks. The series was executive produced by Whoopi Goldberg and only lasted one season. Pevec's other television credits include Cracking Up, Medical Investigation, Without a Trace, and Three Rivers.

Filmography

References

External links 
 

1988 births
21st-century American actresses
American child actresses
American film actresses
American television actresses
Living people
Actresses from Honolulu